Tom Crosshill (real name Toms Kreicbergs) is a Latvian author of speculative and literary fiction, active since 2010. His work has appeared in publications in Chinese, Cuban, English, Finnish,  Latvian and Polish. Crosshill has been nominated for several Nebula awards and won the European Science Fiction Society Award for Best Author in 2016.

Kreicbergs is also an entrepreneur and investment trainer who started his career working on Wall Street in the US. Later he was a co-founder and the first CEO of the regulated asset management company INDEXO from 2017 to 2020. He has been shortlisted by Forbes Baltics in the "40 under 40" list of financial professionals.

Biography

Crosshill was raised in Riga, Latvia, where he learned English at an early age to read American speculative fiction in its original language. He studied physics at Reed College, Portland, Oregon, and later lived in New York and Iowa before returning to his native Latvia.

Literary career
Crosshill honed his craft at the Del Rey Online Writing Workshop in the late 1990s and was later a member of the Altered Fluid writers' group in New York and attended the International Writing Program at the University of Iowa.

His work has appeared in various periodicals, podcasts and anthologies, including The Baltic Atlas, Beneath Ceaseless Skies, Clarkesworld, The Dunesteef Audio Fiction Magazine, Lightspeed, Nebula Awards Showcase 2016, Orson Scott Card's InterGalactic Medicine Show, Sybil's Garage, and Writers of the Future Volume XXVI.

Recognition
Two of Crosshill's stories, "Mama, We Are Zhenya, Your Son" and "Fragmentation, or Ten A Thousand Goodbyes," have been nominated for the Nebula Award for Best Short Story. One short story, "The Magician and Laplace's Demon," has been nominated for the Nebula Award for Best Novelette'.

Crosshill's work has also been nominated for the WSFA Small Press Award and the Annual Latvian Literary Award. He was a winner in the Writers of the Future Contest, published in 2010. He won the European Science Fiction Society Award for Best Author in 2016.

Bibliography

Novels
The Cat King of Havana (2016)
The Cattle Express: A Tale of Wall Street and Siberia (2016)

Collections
Fragmentation: A Collection

Chapbooks
Frammentazione, o diecimila arrivederci (2015; Italian translation of "Fragmentation, or Ten Thousand Goodbyes")

Short fiction

"To Be Alone Again" (2010)
"Waiting for Number Five" (2010)
"Thinking Woman's Crop of Fools" (2010)
"Seeing Double" (2010)
"Express to Paris by Dragon First Class" (2010)
"Mama, We Are Zhenya, Your Son" (2011)
"Fragmentation, or Ten Thousand Goodbyes" (2012)
"Bearslayer and the Black Knight" (2012)
"A Well-Adjusted Man" (2012)
"The Magician and Laplace's Demon" (2014)
"The Dark City Luminous" (2016)

References

External links 
 

Living people
Riga State Gymnasium No.1 alumni
21st-century Latvian writers
Latvian male writers
Writers from Riga
Year of birth missing (living people)
Science fiction writers